Wealthfront Inc. is an automated investment service firm based in Palo Alto, California, founded by Andy Rachleff and Dan Carroll in 2008. , Wealthfront had $27 billion AUM across 470,000 accounts.

History
Wealthfront was founded by Benchmark co-founder Andy Rachleff and Dan Carroll in 2008 as kaChing, a mutual fund analysis company, before pivoting into wealth management. Rachleff was the firm's founding CEO. In December 2012, the firm started tax-loss harvesting for accounts of more than $100,000.

The company started 2013 with $97 million in assets under management and grew by 450% in one year. In 2013, Wealthfront introduced "direct indexing", a tax-loss harvesting platform that purchases the individual securities of an investment portfolio. Between January 2014 and October 2016, Adam Nash was Wealthfront's CEO. Founder Andy Rachleff retook the role in 2016.

In 2016, Wealthfront launched a partnership with the state of Nevada to launch a 529 tax-advantaged college savings plan. In the previous year, Nevada passed approval on a new tax credit for employers who provide fund matching to employees participating in 529 savings programs. Andy Rachleff is currently the executive chairman and chief executive officer. In January 2018, Wealthfront launched homeownership planning tool for Path.  In January 2020, Wealthfront was listed in Business Insider's Top 10 Best Robo Advisors in 2020.

In January 2022, UBS agreed to acquire Wealthfront for $1.4 billion. The acquisition was mutually terminated in September 2022 with both companies not providing a reason. UBS announced that it would instead invest in a $69.7million note convertible into Wealthfront shares, valuing the latter at its acquisition price.

Cash account
In February 2019, Wealthfront introduced a cash account, a high interest savings account. The cash account has an interest rate that tracks the federal funds rate, is FDIC insured up to $1 million, and has an account minimum of $1. Wealthfront is able to offer the $1 million FDIC insurance because it deposits its clients' cash account funds in a network of partner banks including Citibank, HSBC, and Wells Fargo.

In June 2020, Wealthfront added checking features to this account including direct deposit, bill pay, and ATM access.

The cash account was originally available only to clients with an existing investment account. In August 2020, Wealthfront made the cash account generally available.

Fee structure
Wealthfront charges an advisory fee of 0.25% on funds it invests for its clients. Only investment accounts are charged this fee (cash accounts are not). Wealthfront periodically offers a fee waiver of $5,000 if clients sign-up from affiliate links.  Additionally, clients can earn a $5,000 fee waiver for new client referrals; the new client must start using the service, and the fee waiver will be eliminated if the new client leaves the service. Both the referrer and the referee receive the $5,000 fee waiver.

Wealthfront's investment account minimum is $500.

Finances
The company has received funding from Benchmark Capital, DAG Ventures, Index Ventures, Social Capital and individuals, including Marc Andreessen and Jeff Jordan. In April 2014, Wealthfront raised $35 million in a funding round led by Index Ventures, Ribbit Capital and Benchmark Capital. The funding round brought the firm's total funding to $65.5 million.

See also
Robo-advisor

References

External links

Robo-advisors
2008 establishments in California
Financial technology companies
Financial services companies established in 2008
Financial services companies based in California
Companies based in Palo Alto, California
American companies established in 2008